Walter Annis Attenborough (27 November 1850 – 13 June 1932) was a British Conservative Party politician.  He was elected at the January 1910 general election as Member of Parliament (MP) for Bedford (UK Parliament constituency), but was defeated by only 19 votes at the December 1910 general election.

References

External links 
 

1850 births
1932 deaths
Members of the Parliament of the United Kingdom for Bedford
UK MPs 1910